Coleman W. Avery (February 22, 1880 – March 14, 1938) was an American judge. He came from a prominent, wealthy family in Cincinnati, Ohio in the United States. He was appointed as a justice of the Ohio Supreme Court in 1920. He killed himself after murdering his wife in 1938.

Biography
Coleman W. Avery was born on February 22, 1880. He was the son of William Ledyard and Johanna Avery of Cincinnati, Ohio. He was educated in the public schools of the city and graduated in 1902 from the University of Cincinnati, and in 1905 from the University of Cincinnati College of Law.

Avery was admitted to the bar in 1905, and first held public office in 1909, when Hamilton County prosecutor Henry T. Hunt appointed him an assistant prosecutor. In 1912, he was named assistant city solicitor for Cincinnati. In 1914, he ran unsuccessfully for Hamilton County Court of Common Pleas judge.

Beginning in 1915, Avery had a private practice, and taught at the Cincinnati Law School from 1916 to 1918. He was also a special district attorney for war work for the United States attorney for the Southern District of Ohio, 1917 to 1919. He also served as a major in the Second Battalion, Cincinnati Home Guards.

In 1919, Avery returned to private practice. June 10, 1920, Stanley W. Merrell resigned from the Ohio Supreme Court, and Ohio Governor James M. Cox appointed Avery to the court that same day. He lost the November election that year to finish the last two years of the term to Ohio Adjutant General Benson W. Hough. His term ended December 7, 1920.

Following electoral defeat, Avery returned to Cincinnati. He returned to private practice, and lectured at the YMCA School of Law of Cincinnati night classes. In 1935, his oldest son joined him in private practice.

Avery married Elinor Coates Baer of Baltimore, Maryland in 1904. She had five children, and died May 22, 1928 in Asheville, North Carolina from tuberculosis. Avery married Sarah Loving, of Lynchburg, Virginia in 1934.

During the Great Depression, Avery's failing investments in real estate, and uncollected fees of $35,000, put financial stress on his family. He was hospitalized for depression, drank heavily, and had a heart attack. On March 14, 1938, after arguing with his wife over his driving after drinking, Avery murdered his second wife, and committed suicide at his North Bend Road mansion.

A private service was held for Avery's family on March 16, 1938, with burial later that day at Spring Grove Cemetery.

References

External links

1880 births
1938 suicides
American politicians who committed suicide
Burials at Spring Grove Cemetery
Murder–suicides in the United States
Ohio Democrats
Justices of the Ohio Supreme Court
Politicians from Cincinnati
Military personnel from Cincinnati
Suicides in Ohio
University of Cincinnati alumni
University of Cincinnati College of Law alumni
University of Cincinnati College of Law faculty
Salmon P. Chase College of Law faculty
20th-century American judges
Uxoricides
United States Army personnel of World War I
United States Army officers
American murderers